West Danby is a hamlet and census-designated place (CDP) in the town of Danby, Tompkins County, New York, United States. It was first listed as a CDP prior to the 2020 census.

The community is in southern Tompkins County, on the west side of the town of Danby. It is bordered to the west by the town of Newfield. New York State Routes 34 and 96 run together through the center of the hamlet, leading north  to Ithaca and south  to Spencer.

West Danby is on the west side of the deep valley of Cayuga Inlet, which runs north to Cayuga Lake at Ithaca.

Demographics

References 

Census-designated places in Tompkins County, New York
Census-designated places in New York (state)